Angeldiazia is a genus of flowering plants belonging to the family Asteraceae. It contains a single species, Angeldiazia weigendii.

Its native range is Peru.

References

Senecioneae
Monotypic Asteraceae genera